Celaenorrhinus meditrina, commonly known as the large orange sprite, is a species of butterfly in the family Hesperiidae. It is found in Guinea, Sierra Leone, the Ivory Coast, Ghana, Nigeria, Cameroon, Bioko, the Republic of the Congo, the Central African Republic, the Democratic Republic of the Congo, Uganda and north-western Tanzania. The habitat consists of forests and dense secondary growth.

References

Butterflies described in 1877
meditrina
Butterflies of Africa
Taxa named by William Chapman Hewitson